Recovery plan may refer to:

 Disaster recovery plan, a plan to execute an organization's disaster recovery processes, in particular business IT infrastructure, in the event of a disaster
 Endangered species recovery plan, protocols for protecting and enhancing rare and endangered species populations

Economic recovery plans:
 2008 European Union stimulus plan, to cope with the effects of the global financial crisis on EU member countries
 American Recovery and Reinvestment Act of 2009, a U.S. economic a stimulus package 
 Christchurch Central Recovery Plan, in response to the 2011 Christchurch (New Zealand) earthquake
 Emergency Economic Stabilization Act of 2008, U.S. legislation also known as the Troubled Assets Recovery Plan

See also 
 European Recovery Program (informally known as the Marshall Plan), post-World War II recovery plan for Europe